Samuel Henry Dickson (September 20, 1798 - March 31, 1872) was an American poet, physician, writer and educator born in Charleston, South Carolina.

Dickson graduated from Yale and the University of Pennsylvania. He was one of the founders of the Medical College of South Carolina. He also taught at NYU and the Jefferson Medical College in Philadelphia, Pennsylvania. Dickson was a popular published poet and a leader in Charleston intellectual circles. He was friends with Charleston poet William Gilmore Simms and William Cullen Bryant. He and his brother Dr. John Dickson played a significant role in the medical education of the US's first female doctor, Elizabeth Blackwell. He was also active in organizing the first railway in the U.S. by helping bring the locomotive  "the Best Friend of Charleston" into service. Dickson was a frequent lecturer; his addresses included a Phi Beta Kappa Address at Yale in 1842.  In recent years, he has received attention for his proslavery writings.

Dickson died in Philadelphia in 1872.

Selected works
 Hygiene : an introductory lecture (1848)
 On the progress of the Asiatic cholera during the year 1844-45-46-47-48 (1849)

References

Sources
Bain, R. et al. (1980) Southern Writers: A Biographical Dictionary LSU Press  (Southern Writers on Google Books, p126)

Physicians from South Carolina
American male poets
American proslavery activists
Writers from Charleston, South Carolina
1798 births
1872 deaths
Yale University alumni
Perelman School of Medicine at the University of Pennsylvania alumni
Thomas Jefferson University faculty
New York University faculty
19th-century American poets
19th-century American male writers